Emma Lung (born 14 January 1982) is an Australian actress.

Early life and education
Born in Sydney, Lung's father is half-Chinese; his father (Emma's paternal grandfather) was born near Beijing. Lung's mother is Scottish and French.

Growing up in Sydney, Lung attended Newtown High School of the Performing Arts before being accepted into the Professional Performing Arts School in New York City and completed her dramatic studies there.

Career
Lung's first credits include roles in the TV movie Superfire, the feature film Garage Days, and an appearance in the music video for the Shihad song "Comfort Me", all in 2002. In 2003, Lung played Carmelita in the TV film Temptation; she reprised the role in the short-lived spin-off drama series The Cooks which debuted on Network Ten the following year.

Lung received her breakthrough role in the film Peaches starring alongside Jacqueline McKenzie and Hugo Weaving. She starred in the movie 48 Shades alongside Victoria Thaine and Richard Wilson. Further starring roles include Dee McLachlan's film The Jammed in 2007, Christopher Smith's Triangle in 2009 and the 2012 psychological thriller Crave alongside Josh Lawson, Edward Furlong, and Ron Perlman; the film was directed by Charles de Lauzirika. She played Lola, the scheming wife of second son Marou Montebello in ABC TV's 2012 series The Straits. Lung played teacher Colette Riger in the television show Wonderland, which aired on Channel 10 from 2013 to 2015. In 2022 Lung began a recurring role on the Stan streaming series Wolf Like Me.

Awards
At the 2006 Australian Film Institute's Industry Awards, Lung won the award for Outstanding Achievement in Short Film Screen Craft for her acting work on the short film Stranded. At the 2007 Logie awards, Lung won the Graham Kennedy Award For Most Outstanding New Talent for the same role.

At the 2008 Australian Film Institute's Industry Awards, Lung was nominated for Best Lead Actress for her performance in The Jammed.

Personal life
Lung married Henry Zalapa in 2013. Their first child, son Marlowe James Zalapa was born on 5 April 2015. Their second child, daughter Ophelia Sage Zalapa was born in December 2020.

Filmography

Film

Television

References

External links

1982 births
Actresses from Sydney
Australian film actresses
Australian people of Chinese descent
Australian people of French descent
Australian people of Scottish descent
Australian television actresses
Living people
Logie Award winners
People educated at Newtown High School of the Performing Arts
Australian actresses of Asian descent